Edison Alves Freire (born 18 November 1969), also known as Testão, is a Brazilian handball player. He competed in the men's tournament at the 1996 Summer Olympics.

References

External links
 
 

1969 births
Living people
Brazilian male handball players
Olympic handball players of Brazil
Handball players at the 1996 Summer Olympics
Sportspeople from Belo Horizonte